On November 12, 1966, 18-year-old Robert Smith shot and killed five people, four women and a toddler, and injured two others at the Rose-Mar College of Beauty in Mesa, Arizona. All seven victims had been shot and one of the victims who initially survived her wounds was stabbed in the back.

The shooting is considered to be the first copycat mass shooting with Smith indicating that he had wanted to kill more than Charles Whitman, the perpetrator of the University of Texas tower shooting earlier the same year.

Attack 
Smith entered the Rose-Mar College of Beauty and brandished his weapon to gain the attention of the people inside and when no one paid attention he fired a warning shot and then ordered everyone, five students and one customer along with the customer's two babies to head to the back room of the building. Once there, Smith made the victims lie down in a circle with their heads in the center and put sandwich bags over their heads in an attempt to suffocate them, but was unable to fit the bags over their heads.

Smith then shot and killed three of his victims with shots to head, but the oldest baby survived her wounds and squirmed before being stabbed to death by Smith. The customer, Joyce Sellers, managed to shield the body of her youngest child and the child survived with a gunshot wound in the arm. The fifth woman, Bonita Harris, survived by playing dead after she was shot. Harris recounted to the police that Smith had laughed as he shot his victims.

While Smith was killing the women in the back room, the operator of the school, Eveline Cummings, entered the school and heard the gunshots. Upon hearing this, Cummings fled and called the police who arrived shortly afterwards. Smith turned himself in to the responding police officers without incident.

Victims

Dead 
 Mary Olsen, 18 (student)
 Glenda Carter, 18 (student)
 Carol Farmer, 19 (student)
 Joyce Sellers, 27 (customer)
 Debra Sellers, 3 (child of Joyce Sellers)

Injured 
 Bonita Harris, 18 (student)
 Tammy Sellers, 3-months (child of Joyce Sellers)

Perpetrator 
The gunman, 18-year-old Robert Benjamin Smith, a resident of Mesa, surrendered without incident to responding police. Smith was a high school senior at the time of the attack.

Smith told police that he was inspired by mass murderers Charles Whitman and Richard Speck who had carried out mass murders earlier the same year. Smith told responding police that he simply sought infamy and wanted to be known and remembered. Smith explained that he had hoped to kill ten times as many people as he had. It was later observed that Smith had become captivated with historical figures such as Napoleon Bonaparte, Julius Caesar, and later Adolf Hitler. After the assassination of John F. Kennedy in 1963, Smith also became awe-struck by Kennedy's assassin, Lee Harvey Oswald.

See also 
 List of attacks related to post-secondary schools

References 

1966 mass shootings in the United States
1966 murders in the United States
Mass shootings in Arizona
1966 in Arizona
20th-century mass murder in the United States
Deaths by firearm in Arizona
1966 crimes in the United States
Mass murder in 1966
Mass shootings in the United States
Massacres in 1966
Massacres in the United States
School shootings in the United States
School massacres in the United States
History of Mesa, Arizona
Events in Maricopa County, Arizona